HMS Battleaxe was a Type 22 frigate of the British Royal Navy. She was sold to the Brazilian Navy on 30 April 1997 and renamed Rademaker.

Construction and design
Battleaxe was ordered by the British Admiralty on 4 September 1974, as the second Batch I Type 22 Frigate. The ship was laid down at Yarrow Shipbuilders' Scotstoun shipyard on 4 February 1976, and was launched by Audrey Callaghan, the wife of James Callaghan, the Prime Minister at the time, on 18 May 1977. Battleaxe was completed on 28 March 1980.

They gave a speed of  when powered by the Olympuses and  when powered by the Tynes.

Anti-aircraft armament consisted of two sextuple Sea Wolf surface-to-air missile launchers, one forward of the bridge, and one on the roof of the helicopter hangar. Four Exocet MM-38 anti-ship missiles were fitted on the forecastle. Gun armament was limited to a pair of  Bofors guns, mainly for peacetime patrol duties. A hangar and flight deck was fitted aft, allowing the ship to operate two Westland Lynx helicopters, which could carry anti-submarine torpedoes, while close-in anti-submarine armament was two triple STWS-1  torpedo tubes.

Operational history

Royal Navy
Battleaxe did deploy to the South Atlantic shortly after the end of the war, however, escorting the aircraft carrier , leaving Devonport on 2 August, reaching the vicinity of the Falklands on 24 August and returning to Britain on 19 November. She was deployed to the South Atlantic again from July 1983 to December 1983. On 2 July 1988, Battleaxe rescued the stricken sailors from the yacht Dalriada, which had sunk after colliding with the submarine 's periscope.

Battleaxe was deployed on the Armilla patrol, the Royal Navy's standing deployment in the Persian Gulf in August 1990 when Iraq invaded Kuwait. She returned to Plymouth in November 1990.

Brazil

Rademaker was involved in an unfortunate incident on 29 November 2004, during the annual FRATERNO naval exercise with ships of the Argentinian Navy. While conducting gunnery practice against target drones, a malfunction of the Argentinian frigate 's automatic weapons system caused her to fire on Rademaker; four Brazilian crewmen were injured together with an Argentine naval observer. The ship suffered moderate damage.

Also in 2004, Rademaker deployed to Port-au-Prince, as part of the United Nations Stabilization Mission in Haiti.

In April 2017, Rademaker was involved in the search for the missing bulk carrier  after she disappeared in the Atlantic.

Rademaker joined the international efforts to locate the missing Argentine submarine  in November 2017.

References

Publications

 
 
 
 
 
 
 

Ships built on the River Clyde
1977 ships
Type 22 frigates of the Royal Navy
Type 22 frigates of the Brazilian Navy
Gulf War ships of the United Kingdom